A wall of kindness ( dīvār-e mehrabānī;  Dewar e meherbani) is a charity work phenomenon and a kind of welfare, usually done by attaching cloth hangers from outside of houses; those encourage people to donate miscellaneous useful things such as winter clothing. It was introduced by an anonymous Iranian, and the practice quickly spread throughout the country. The motto of the movement are two sentences that appear on the walls: "Leave what you don't need" and "Take what you do".

Description

Initially started for the homeless people of Mashhad, Iran, the act is intended to support the people in need. In response to social media, large numbers of people are taking part as a campaign and it has helped many homeless or otherwise destitute people during the cold winter weather.

A similar initiative, but with open fridges, spread from Tehran to other cities. Bookshelves are also being added to the walls of kindness in order to donate books for poor children.

A wall of kindness was seen in Pakistan's Karachi on 15 January 2016 and another one in China's Liuzhou, located in  Guangxi Zhuang Autonomous Region on 29 January 2016. Also students of Marymount International School of Rome, in April 2016, have reproduced the idea by designating a wall with a similar function and name. A wall of kindness was set up in Peshawar by Serve Mankind & Wadaan and afterwards, it started spreading all over Pakistan. Rawalpindi, Lahore, Sialkot, Quetta, Khuzdar, and Karachi have witnessed similar walls where people are leaving clothes and other essential items for the poor.

A new Wall of Kindness was recently witnessed in Amman/Jordan at the Landmark Amman Hotel on 21 November 2017, which marked the first day of rain, inviting generous souls including children to donate clothes anonymously for the most in need ahead of the winter season. After donations are received, the laundry team at the hotel picks up the clothes, cleans them, irons them, wraps them up and hangs them back so they are available for the recipients, just like brand new items.

Similar walls known as "Neki ki Deewar" have sprung up in multiple cities across India such as Allahabad, Bhilwara, Jhalawar, Mysore, Chandigrah, Bhopal, Dehradun, Korba and Kolkata sometimes even having more supply than demand of clothes. The walls are also serving the unexpected purpose of keeping walls clean and free from spitting.

Background

The economy of Iran was hit when sanctions were imposed by the Western World. As the situation became worse, with an increasing number of unemployed, many could not afford clothes. Inflation caused particular difficulties for those in need. In the winter of 2015, young Iranians in Wahid came up with the idea. The main theme was to meet the demand for resources from charities. For the first time, a wall symbolizes unity rather than separation and the community has been asked to donate voluntarily. As soon as the attempt came to the attention of various social and mass media platforms, it was supported and praised by citizens as well as netizens.

Young Iranians took the chance to strengthen the bonds of community. The campaign went smoothly despite the risk of misuse and loss of resources. People were responsive and well aware of the fact that most vulnerable should get priority.
 
Winter clothing disbursed among mass number of people as welfare had been seen before.

See also

References

Charity in Iran
Charity in Pakistan
Charity in China
Charity in India